The Government of President Vladislav Ardzinba was the first Government of the Republic of Abkhazia.

Formation
In February 1995, the Ministry for Energy was transformed into the state company Abkhazenergo, renamed to Chernomorenergo in June. The Ministry for Industry and the Ministry for Transport and Communication were also abolished.

Changes
On the night of 11 September 1995, Vice Premier Yuri Voronov was shot dead in front of his apartment.
On 2 June 1996, President Ardzinba dismissed Interior Minister Givi Agrba for unsatisfactory work and Defence Minister Sultan Sosnaliyev for family reasons, and replaced them with, respectively, the head of his own security office Almasbei Kchach and Vice-Premier Vladimir Mikanba.
On 24 April 1997, Prime Minister Gennady Gagulia resigned for health reasons. On 29 April, President Ardzinba appointed First Vice Premier Sergei Bagapsh as his successor. Bagapsh was replaced as First Vice-Premier by Foreign Minister Konstantin Ozgan, who was in turn replaced by Sergei Shamba on 30 April.
In February 1998, Justice Minister Batal Tabagua was additionally appointed the representative of President Ardzinba to the People's Assembly. In August, Tabagua was instead appointed the Abkhazian representative to the peace negotiations with Georgia, replacing Tamaz Ketsba.
In March 1998, President Ardzinba decreed the creation of the State Committee for State Property Management and Privatisation and appointed Tamaz Gogia as its Chairman.
On 16 April, Konstantin Ozgan was replaced as Economy Minister by Beslan Kubrava, who had previously headed the State Tax Service.
In April 1998, President Ardzinba signed a decree on the creation of the State Committee for Repatriation.
In April 1998, President Ardzinba dismissed Viacheslav Tsugba as First Vice Premier, Grigori Enik as Head of the Cabinet Office as well as two other Vice Premiers.
In May 1998, President Arzinba signed a decree reducing the number of Deputy Ministers in each department except the Interior and Defence to one.
Ardzinba was re-elected unopposed in on 3 October 1999 and his re-inauguration was scheduled for 6 December.
After a bomb attack on 13 December 1999 in Sukhumi targeting government officials, President Ardzinba dismissed Astamur Tarba as Security Service Chairman and replaced him with First Deputy Chairman of the State Customs Committee Raul Khajimba.
On 2 February 2000, Iuri Aqaba was appointed Vice-Premier and succeeded as Agriculture Minister by Anatoli Sabua. Astamur Tarba was appointed Secretary of the Security Council.
On 18 June 2001, Chairman of the State Security Service Raul Khajimba was appointed First Vice-Premier, succeeding Beslan Kubrava. On 19 June, the Head of the Cabinet Staff and the Chairmen of the State Committees for Customs, State Property Management and Foreign Economical Relations, and on 20 June, the Ministers for Defence, Foreign Affairs, Finance, Economy, Agriculture, Justice, Health, Education and Culture were re-appointed. On 27 June, Givi Dopua was appointed as Chairman for the State Committee for Repatriation, Elena Gunia as Chairman of the State Committee for Standards, Metrology and Certification, and outgoing Interior Minister Almasbei Kchach head of the presidential security detail. On 29 June, President Ardzinba approved the revised Cabinet structure, which included the new Ministry for Youth, Sports, Resorts and Tourism. On 2 July, Supreme Court Judge Zurab Agumava was appointed Minister of the Interior.
 On 19 July, Vladimir Zantaria was released as Culture Minister and appointed Vice-Premier.
 On 17 September, President Ardzinba signed a decree renaming the Ministry for Agriculture into the Ministry of Agriculture and Food and appointed Albert Topoloyan Minister for Youth, Sports, Resorts and Tourism, replacing acting minister Valeri Bartsits.
 On 1 November, First Vice Premier Raul Khajimba was released as Head of the State Security Service, a post which up until then he had still occupied. He was succeeded by Interior Minister Zurab Agumava, who in turn was succeeded by his predecessor Almasbei Kchach.
 On 16 May 2002, Raul Khajimba replaced Vladimir Mikanba as Defence Minister, while remaining First Vice-Premier.
 On 28 May 2002, President Ardzinba dismissed Konstantin Ozgan as Head of the Revenue Service due to his election as Deputy of the People's Assembly. He was replaced by Economy Minister Adgur Lushba, who was in turn replaced by Vice-Premier Beslan Kubrava (while remaining Vice-Premier).
 On 29 November 2002, Prime Minister Jergenia was fired by President Ardzinba, officially due to his failure to ensure fulfillment of budget targets and to prepare adequately for winter. However, for the first nine months of that year budget had been implemented fully and Jergenia's dismissal was widely seen as politically motivated, having been too openly ambitious about the presidency, and putting Russian above Abkhazian interests. Jergenia was replaced by the Head of the Commerce Chamber, former Prime Minister Gennady Gagulia. On 9 December, Ardzinba decreed the new structure of the cabinet. The State Committee for Foreign Economic Relations was merged into the Ministry for Economy, becoming the Ministry for Economy and Foreign Economic Relations. The Ministry for Labour and Social Security was merged into the Ministry for Health, becoming the Ministry for Health and Social Security. The State Tax Service was transformed into the Ministry for Taxes and Fees. That same day, Ardzinba re-appointed Khajimba as First Vice Premier and Defence Minister and Zantaria as Vice Premier, and he appointed Ruslan Ardzinba, previously deputy chairman of the State Committee for Foreign Economic Relations, as Minister for Economy and Foreign Economic Relations as well as First Vice Premier (alongside Khajimba). On 18 December, the remaining members of the cabinet were appointed. Outgoing Economy Minister and Vice Premier Beslan Kubrava succeeded Konstantin Tuzhba as Chief of the Cabinet Staff. Adgur Lushba, also a former Economy Minister, was appointed as the new Minister for Taxes and Fees. Gulripshi District Head Adgur Kharazia replaced Jemal Eshba as Minister for Agriculture and Food, Tengiz Lakerbaia Batal Tabagua as Minister for Justice, Astamur Adleiba Albert Topolyan as Minister for Youth, Sports, Resorts and Tourism and Astamur Appba Tamaz Gogia as Chairman of the State Committee for Property Management and Privatisation. Gagra District Head Grigori Enik succeeded Aslan Kobakhia as Head of the State Customs Committee and Abkhazian State University Rector Aleko Gvaramia succeeded Beslan Dbar as Minister for General, Secondary and Higher Education (while remaining Rector). On 26 December, Appba was succeeded as the President's Representative to the People's Assembly by Marina Pilia, who up to then had worked in the President's Administration.
 On 2 April 2003, Advisor to the President on Military Matters Givi Agrba was appointed Head of the State Security Service, replacing Zurab Agumava.
 In the evening of 7 April 2003, Gagulia's government filed for resignation. Early in the morning of that day, nine prisoners had escaped, four of which had been sentenced to death due to their involvement in the 2001 Kodori crisis. President Ardzinba initially refused to accept Gagulia's resignation, but was forced to agree on 8 April. Vice President Valery Arshba denied on 8 April that the government's resignation was due to the prison escape, and stated that instead it was caused by the opposition's plans to hold protest rallies on 10 April. On 22 April 2003, Raul Khajimba was appointed the new Prime Minister. On 1 May, Ardzinba agreed the new (mostly unchanged) cabinet structure. Secretary of the Security Council Astamur Tarba was appointed Khajimba's successor as First Vice Premier, and Vice-Chairman of the National Bank Emma Tania was appointed Vice Premier. On 5 May, Viacheslav Eshba was appointed Khajimba's successor as Defence Minister and some other ministers were re-appointed. On 8 May, several more appointments were made: Abesalom Beia succeeded Almasbei Kchach as Interior Minister, New Athos Mayor Vitali Smyr Adgur Kharazia as Agriculture Minister, Konstantin Tuzhba Ruslan Ardzinba as Economy Minister and Oleg Botsiev Beslan Kubrava as Chief of the Cabinet Staff. On 6 June, Almasbei Kchach was appointed Secretary of the Security Council.
On 1 September 2003, Aleko Gvaramia handed his resignation as Education Minister. On 15 September, acting president Valery Arshba declared that he had not yet officially accepted Gvaramia's resignation. On 13 November, President Ardzinba officially granted Gvaramia's request and appointed Head of the State Fund for the Development of the Abkhaz language Tali Japua in his stead.
 On 15 December 2003, President Ardzinba replaced the head of the Presidential Administration Miron Agrba with Gennady Gagulia.
 On 9 January 2004, President Ardzinba decreed the creation of the State Committee for Forest. On 28 April, Ardzinba appointed Abkhazles head Eduard Jergenia as its Chairman.
 On 15 June 2004, Foreign Minister Sergei Shamba, First Vice-Premier Astamur Tarba and Security Service Chairman Givi Agrba resigned following the murder of opposition politician Garri Aiba. Tarba eventually stayed on, Shamba was temporarily replaced by his deputy Gueorgui Otyrba on 18 July, and permanently by Igor Akhba on 28 July. On 7 July Agrba's resignation was accepted and he was replaced by Mikhail Tarba. Head of the Presidential Administration Gennady Gagulia also handed his resignation on 18 June (granted the same day) because he didn't want to be part of Prime Minister Khajimba's presidential campaign. On 24 June, Gagulia was elected to once more head the Chamber of Commerce, succeeding Yuri Aqaba who resigned to pursue his academic work.
On 10 November 2004, Ardzinba appointed outgoing Vice Premier Emma Tania acting Chairman of the National Bank of the Republic of Abkhazia. On 14 December, Ardzinba decreed the new cabinet structure and made a number of ministerial appointments. The position of First Vice Premier was abolished and presidential candidate Sergei Shamba and Viktor Khilchevski were appointed to succeed Vlamir Zantaria and Emma Tania as Vice Premiers. Shamba was also appointed as Foreign Minister, the position he had resigned from in June, succeeding Igor Akhba. A new Ministry for Emergency Situations was created, to which deputy Interior Minister Sergei Matosyan was appointed. The portfolio for Youth, Sports, Resorts and Tourism was redistributed over the existing Ministries for Education (Youth and Sports) and Economy (Resorts and Tourism). A number of Ministries and State Committees received slightly different names: Economy and Foreign Economic Relations was shortened to Economic Development, Agriculture and Food to Agriculture and General, Secondary and Higher Education to Education while Repatriation was extended to Repatriation and Demography and Forest to Forestry. Outgoing Deputy Chairman Lavrik Mikvabia was appointed Chairman of the Customs State Committee instead of Grigori Enik and Abkhazia's Plenipotentiary in Karachay-Cherkessia Aleksandr Chengelia Chairman of the Property Management and Privatisation State Committee instead of Astamur Appba. The following day, Zantaria was appointed head of the newly created Agency for Press, Information and Telecommunications, Supreme Court Chairman Gennadi Stepanov was appointed Minister for Justice instead of Tengiz Lakerbaia and Oleg Botsiev was re-appointed as Head of the Cabinet Staff. On 23 December, Eduard Jergenia was re-appointed as Chairman of the Forest(ry) State Committee.
On 1 February 2005, Ardzinba accepted the resignation of Education Minister Tali Japua, who was temporarily replaced by his deputy Natalya Kayun.

References

External links
 Government structure at the beginning of Anri Jergenia's term as Prime Minister
 Government structure at the beginning of Gennadi Gagulia's term as Prime Minister
 Government structure at the beginning of Raul Khajimba's term as Prime Minister
 Government structure at the beginning of Nodar Khashba's term as Prime Minister

Ardzinba
1994 establishments in Abkhazia
2005 disestablishments in Abkhazia
Cabinets established in 1994
Cabinets disestablished in 2005